Stacpoole is a surname. Notable people with the surname include:

Frederick Stacpoole (1813–1907), English engraver
Henry De Vere Stacpoole (1863–1951), Irish author
Richard Fitzgeorge de Stacpoole, 1st Duke de Stacpoole (1787–1848), Anglo-French Catholic aristocrat
William Stacpoole (1830–1879), Irish nationalist politician